Nicholas S. Bouquet (14 November 1842 – 27 December 1912) was a German soldier who fought in the American Civil War. Bouquet received the United States' highest award for bravery during combat, the Medal of Honor, for his action during the Battle of Wilson's Creek in Missouri on 10 August 1861. He was honored with the award on 16 February 1897.

Biography
Bouquet was born in Bavaria, Germany on 14 November 1842. He was sent to the United States in order to prevent him serving in the army in Germany. Before the breakout of the American Civil war he worked as a cooper and barrel maker in Burlington. He enlisted into the 1st Iowa Infantry at Burlington, Iowa in April 1861.

During the Battle of Wilson's Creek, Bouquet assisted another gunner from Company A, which was manning the Totten's Battery, in retrieving a disabled gun and preventing it from being captured by the Confederates.

He joined the 25th Iowa Infantry as a sergeant in July 1862, and mustered out with this regiment in June 1865.

Bouquet is buried at Aspen Grove Cemetery in Burlington.

Medal of Honor citation

See also

List of American Civil War Medal of Honor recipients: A–F

References

1842 births
1912 deaths
German-born Medal of Honor recipients
Bavarian emigrants to the United States
People of Iowa in the American Civil War
Union Army soldiers
United States Army Medal of Honor recipients
American Civil War recipients of the Medal of Honor